Events from the year 1919 in Sweden

Incumbents
 Monarch – Gustaf V
 Prime Minister - Nils Edén

Events

 24 May - Women suffrage is approved by parliament and are to be used for the first time in the 1921 election. 
 18 September - AB Svensk Filmindustri (SF) is founded.

Births
 4 July - Gerd Hagman, actress  (died 2011)
 17 August - Ulla Ryghe, film editor (died 2011 in Canada)
 21 November - Gert Fredriksson, canoer (died 2006)
 31 December - Folke Alnevik, athlete

Deaths
 22 January - Carl Larsson, painter  (born 1853) 
 20 February - Augusta Lundin, fashion designer  (born 1840)
 29 July - Martina Bergman-Österberg, physical education instructor  (born 1849) 
 10 September - Helena Munktell, composer  (born 1852) 
 3 November - Alina Jägerstedt, trade unionist and social democrat  (born 1853) 
 Rosalie Sjöman, photographer  (born 1833)

References

 
Years of the 20th century in Sweden
Sweden